Eastern Sidekick (Hangul: 이스턴 사이드킥) was a South Korean indie rock band formed in 2010, but they officially debuted under Fluxus Music includes Clazziquai, Urban Zakapa in 2013. The band consisted of Juhwan Oh on vocals, Hangyul Ko on lead guitar and main songwriter, Sanghwan bae on bass guitar, Inhyuk Ryu on guitars and Geunchang Park on drums.

Career

Members says the band's name came from they were thinking Asia and that is where 'Eastern' came from, They added 'Sidekick' because they were going for something out of the form. Eastern Sidekick initiated by Hangyul and Myungchul from circle activity, then other members joined. Accordingly, every song's title and lyrics written in Korean to have a strong Eastern atmosphere only composed and written by Hangyul as the band's leader. Eastern Sidekick is known for their own oriental garage rock sound well. They also became known to Korean indie music scene by won 'Rookie Of The Years' of Olleh Music Indie Awards, EBS Hello Rookie 2010 and Hyundai Card Music: Indie Band TV commercial. 
In addition they having gigs in live house in Hongdae where most of Korean indie bands playing in Seoul, they had many performances in overseas music festival such as Music Matters Live 2013 in Singapore and Summersonic 2013 in Japan not only Korean domestic music festival such as Pentaport Rock Festival 2011, 2012 and Green Plugged Festival.
The band was awarded Weekly Champion in Fuji TV's global band music contest show 'Asia Versus', and also supported Jang Keun-suk's second album showcase and concert tour in Japan as a session musician. However, the band decided to disband in May 2016.

Members 
Hangyul Ko – Lead Guitar (2010–present)
 Juhwan Oh – Lead Vocals (2010–present)
 Sanghwan Bae – Bass guitar (2010–present)
 Inhyuk Ryu – Guitar (2010–present)
 Geunchang Park – Drums (2014–present

 Myungchul Ko - Drums (2010–2014)

Discography

Studio albums

Extended plays

Music videos

References

External links
 Facebook
 Twitter

South Korean indie rock groups
Musical groups established in 2010
2010 establishments in South Korea